Jawahar Navodaya Vidyalaya is a school in Kodagu, India and is a part of the Navodaya Vidyalaya group. The school is located near Madikeri,  which is 7 km from Madikeri, headquarters of Kodagu district. The school is also known as JNV Kodagu.

History 
Established in 1987, under the Navodaya Vidyalaya Scheme, the school is CBSE affiliated, co-educational and residential.Initially when the school building and other infrastructure was under development, the school was operational in a building in the Government Junior premises at Madikeri Town,In 1995 the Vidyalaya was shifted to the present site at Galibeedu Road.

Purpose 
Jawahar Navodaya Vidyalaya known as JNV are Indian schools for talented children and form a part of the system of gifted education. The objectives of the scheme are to provide good quality modern education to the rural talented children  in each district of the country. These vidyalayas 
are fully residential, co-educational with reservations for 75% rural, urban 33%, 33% girls, 15% SC, 7.5% ST, and 3% Physically Handicapped students. The unique feature of Navodaya Scheme is the migration system for promoting national integration through an exchange of 30% of students of 9th from Hindi speaking states to Non-Hindi speaking and vice versa.

Co-Curricular Activities 
Various competitions of literary, cultural, performing art, visual art, physical education, sports and games etc. are conducted regularly. All the competitions are conducted house wise in order to inculcate healthy competitive spirit among children. Students of the Vidyalaya participate in the Republic Day and Independence day celebrations at District Headquarters every year.

House System 
The students are accommodated in four houses named after the old mountain ranges of the country Viz. Aravali, Nilgiri, Shivalik, Udaygiri separately for boys and girls and for juniors and seniors. The teachers are assigned the duties of Housemasters for boys and Housemistresses for girls.

Migration 
Migration of  students in class 9 takes place every year to JNV Manpur. Also approximately same number of students immigrate here from that school. It aims at bringing regional harmony and bringing unity against regionalism. It also facilitates the students to get a chance to learn languages other than their own. The students have to fill in the willingness form to assure that they are ready for migration at the time of admission. The selection of students is upon willingness and if it does not meet the 30% of the batch in 9th class, a lot system is adopted. Those who are not ready even after they are selected under lot, will have to quit the school. But till date, everyone who has enjoyed the migration facility, are satisfied and happy about the living at Manpur except Darshan J.

References

External links

Schools in Kodagu district
Educational institutions established in 1987
1987 establishments in Karnataka
Boarding schools in Karnataka
Jawahar Navodaya Vidyalayas in Karnataka